Joe Hayes (born September 15, 1960) is a former American football running back. He played for the Philadelphia Eagles in 1984.

References

1960 births
Living people
American football running backs
Central Oklahoma Bronchos football players
Philadelphia Eagles players
Players of American football from Dallas